A kuladevata, also known as a kuladaivaṃ, is an ancestral tutelary deity in Hinduism and Jainism. 

Such a deity is often the object of one's devotion (bhakti), and is coaxed to watch over one's clan (kula), gotra, family, and children from misfortune. This is distinct from an ishta-devata (personal tutelar) and a grāmadevatā (village deities).

Male kuladevatas are sometimes referred to as a kuladeva, while their female counterparts are called a kuladevi.

Etymology 
The word kuladevata is derived from two words: kula, meaning clan, and devata, meaning deity, referring to the ancestral deities that are worshipped by particular clans.

Veneration 
The deity can be represented in a male or a female human, an animal, or even an object, like a holy stone. It is believed that rituals done at a kuladeva/kuladevi temple benefits all those genetically connected with the one performing the ritual. Kuladaivams of the Shaiva tradition are often considered to be forms of Shiva and Parvati, while those of the Vaishnava tradition are often regarded to be forms of Vishnu and Lakshmi. Hindu families make a pilgrimage to the kuladevata or kuladevi temple to obtain the blessing of the deity after an auspicious occasion, such as a wedding. Kuladevatas are worshipped in several sects of Hinduism and Jainism. 

Due to the veneration of holy men (babas) in several regions of the subcontinent, several communities consider such men to be their kuladevatas in the place of a deity.  

In western India, some communities regard local monarchs who belonged to their clan to be their kuladevata.

List 
The following is a non-exhaustive list of the various kuladevatas revered in different regions of the Indian subcontinent:

Southern India

Andhra Pradesh 
Some of the primary kuladevatas of Andhra Pradesh include:
 Venkateshvara

 Vasavi Kanyaka Parameshvari

Karnataka 
Some of the primary kuladevatas of Karnataka include:

 Chennakeshava
 Narasimha
 Virupaksha

Kerala 
Some of the primary kuladevatas of Kerala include:

 Padmanabhaswamy
 Guruvayurappan
 Narayani
 Lakshmi-Narayana
 Narasimha
 Ganesha
 Ayyappan
 Shasta
 Navadurga
 Damodara

Tamil Nadu 
Some of the primary kuladevatas of Tamil Nadu include:
Annanmar Thangal
 Shastha
 Kurathiamman
 Kamakshi
Angalamman
 Kala Bhairavar
Narasimha
Bhadrakali
 Kallalagar
 Mariamman
 Thillai Kali
 Karuppu Sami 
 Pavadairayan
 Renukamba 
 Pachchaiamman
 Peradachiyamman
 Periyandichiyamman
Madurai Veeran
Muneeshvarar
Ayyanar
Murugan
Veerabhadrar
 Periandavar
Sudalaimadan
Nondi Veeran
 Saptha kanni amman

Western India

Maharashtra 
The kuladevatas worshipped in Maharashtra include:
Ambabai
Vajreshwari
Mahalakshmi
Tulja Bhavani
Charbhuja
Ekvira
Jyotiba
Jaganmata/Parvati/Durga
Khandoba
Jyotiba
Khandoba
Kedar Janani
Lakshmi-Narasimha
Mahadeva
Mandhradevi
Renuka 
Vasavi Mata
Mothi Devi 
Shree Vyadeshwar
Yamai
Yogeshvari
Manudevi
Shakatambika
Lakshmi

Konkan 
The kuladevatas venerated in the Konkan region include:

Aryadurga
Bhagavati
Chamundeshwari
Damodar
 Devaki-Krishna
Gajantalakshmi
Ekvira
Jaganmata
Kamakshi
Mallikarjuna
Maha Ganapathi Mahammaya
Mahalakshmi
Mahalasa
Mahamaya
Mahamaya Kalika
Mangeshi
Nageshi
Kali
 Waghjai
Lakshmi-Narasimha
Navadurga
Ramnath
Ravalnath
Saptakoteshwar
Shantadurga
Sharwani Vetal
Vijayadurga
Vimleshwar
Vetala
Rameshwar
Mauli 
 Venkataraman

Gujarat and Rajasthan 
The kuladevatas worshipped in Gujarat and Rajasthan include:
Arasuri Ambaji 
Momai Mata
 Ashapura Mata
 Baba Mohan Rama
 Baba Ramdevji
 Suswani Mata
 Bhadrakali
 Bhatiji Maharaj
 Brahmani Mata
 Chamunda Mata
 Dada Jasraj 
 Dev Narain
 Gajanan Mata 
 Gogaji
 Vitthalanatha
 Harkor
 Harsidhhi Mata
 Hinglaj Mata
 Jeen Mata

 Mahakali Mata
 Mahalakshmi Mata
 Manasa Devi 
 Modheswari
 Nagnechiya Maa 
 Pabuji 
 Rana Jashraj 
 Sachiya Mata
 Sati Mata
 Tanot Mata
 Tulja Bhavani
 Vachra Dada
 Varahi Mata
 Veer Teja 
 Vindhya

Eastern India

Bengal 
In Bengal, the following deities are venerated as kuladevatas:

Kali
 Durga
 Shiva
 Parvati
 Jagadhatri
 Narayana
 Krishna
 Lakshmi-Narayana
 Shitala
 Chandi
 Chaitanya Mahaprabhu
 Manasa

Sri Lanka 
The following is a list of kuladevatas venerated in Sri Lanka:
 Nayinai Nagapoosani
 Nallur Murugan

References

Hindu deities
Tutelary deities